Guy Chevalier (born May 25, 1938 in Les Herbiers) is a French clergyman and bishop for the Roman Catholic Diocese of Taiohae. He was appointed bishop in 1985. He retired in 2015.

See also
Catholic Church in France

References

1938 births
French Roman Catholic bishops
Roman Catholic bishops of Taiohae
Living people
University of Strasbourg alumni